The 24th Edition Vuelta a España (Tour of Spain), a long-distance bicycle stage race and one of the three grand tours, was held from 23 April to 11 May 1969. Raymond Steegmans won the points competition and Luis Ocaña, who demonstrated his time trialling skills by winning the prologue and two time trials in the race, won the mountains classification.

Teams and riders

Route

Results

References

External links
Results of 1969 Vuelta on cyclebase.nl

 
1969 in road cycling
1969
1969 in Spanish sport
1969 Super Prestige Pernod